In mathematics, the Selberg trace formula, introduced by  , is an expression for the character of the unitary representation of a Lie group  on the space  of square-integrable functions, where  is a cofinite discrete group.

The simplest case is when  is cocompact, when the representation breaks up into discrete summands. Here the trace formula is an extension of the Frobenius formula for the character of an induced representation of finite groups. When  is the cocompact subgroup  of the real numbers , the Selberg trace formula is essentially the Poisson summation formula.

The case when  is not compact is harder, because there is a continuous spectrum, described using Eisenstein series. Selberg worked out the non-compact case when  is the group ; the extension to higher rank groups is the Arthur–Selberg trace formula.

When  is the fundamental group of a Riemann surface, the Selberg trace formula describes the spectrum of differential operators such as the Laplacian in terms of geometric data involving the lengths of geodesics on the Riemann surface. In this case the Selberg trace formula is formally similar to the explicit formulas relating the zeros of the Riemann zeta function to prime numbers, with the zeta zeros corresponding to eigenvalues of the Laplacian, and the primes corresponding to geodesics. Motivated by the analogy, Selberg introduced the Selberg zeta function of a Riemann surface, whose analytic properties are encoded by the Selberg trace formula.

Early history
Cases of particular interest include those for which the space is a compact Riemann surface . The initial publication in 1956 of Atle Selberg dealt with this case, its Laplacian differential operator and its powers. The traces of powers of a Laplacian can be used to define the  Selberg zeta function. The  interest of this case was the  analogy between the formula obtained, and the explicit formulae of prime number theory. Here the closed geodesics on  play the role of prime numbers.

At the same time, interest in the traces of Hecke operators was linked to the Eichler–Selberg trace formula, of Selberg and Martin Eichler, for a Hecke operator acting on a vector space of cusp forms of a given weight, for a given congruence subgroup of the modular group. Here the trace of the identity operator is the dimension of the vector space, i.e. the dimension of the space of modular forms of a given type: a quantity traditionally calculated by means of the Riemann–Roch theorem.

Applications
The trace formula has applications to arithmetic geometry and number theory.  For instance, using the trace theorem, Eichler and Shimura calculated the Hasse–Weil L-functions associated to modular curves; Goro Shimura's methods by-passed the analysis involved in the trace formula. The development of parabolic cohomology (from Eichler cohomology) provided a purely algebraic setting based on group cohomology, taking account of the cusps characteristic of non-compact Riemann surfaces and modular curves.

The trace formula also has purely differential-geometric applications.  For instance, by a result of Buser, the length spectrum of a Riemann surface is an isospectral invariant, essentially by the trace formula.

Later work
The general theory of Eisenstein series was largely motivated by the requirement to separate out the continuous spectrum, which is characteristic of the non-compact case.

The trace formula is often given for algebraic groups over the adeles rather than for Lie groups, because this makes the corresponding discrete subgroup  into an algebraic group over a field which is technically easier to work with. Gel'fand et al also treat SL2() where  is a locally compact topological field with ultrametric norm, so a finite extension of the p-adic numbers Qp or of the formal Laurent series Fq((T)); they also handle the adelic case in characteristic 0, combining all completions R and Qp of the rational numbers Q.

Contemporary successors of the theory are the Arthur–Selberg trace formula applying to the case of general semisimple G, and the many studies of the trace formula in the Langlands philosophy (dealing with technical issues such as endoscopy). The Selberg trace formula can be derived from the Arthur–Selberg trace formula with some effort.

Selberg trace formula for compact hyperbolic surfaces

The Selberg trace formula for this case is easier than the general case because the surface is compact so there is no continuous spectrum, and the group  has no parabolic or elliptic elements (other than the identity).

Using the variable substitution

the eigenvalues are labeled

Then the Selberg trace formula is given by

The right hand side is a sum over conjugacy classes of the group , with the first term corresponding to the identity element and the remaining terms forming a sum over the other conjugacy classes  (which are all hyperbolic in this case). The function  has to satisfy the following:

 ;
 there exist positive constants  and  such that: 

Notes

References

External links
Selberg trace formula resource page

Automorphic forms